William Floyd Clinger Jr. (April 4, 1929 – May 28, 2021) was an American attorney and Republican politician who represented northwest and north-central Pennsylvania in the U.S. House of Representatives from 1979 to 1997.

Early life and education
Clinger was born in Warren, Pennsylvania, the son of Lella May (Hunter) and William F. Clinger. He attended the public schools there and graduated from The Hill School in 1947. He earned a Bachelor of Arts degree from Johns Hopkins University in 1951 and a Bachelor of Laws from the University of Virginia in 1965.

Career 
Clinger served as an officer in the United States Navy from 1951 to 1955. He was a delegate to the Pennsylvania state constitutional convention, 1967 to 1968, and the Republican National Convention in 1972. Clinger was associated with the New Process Company of Warren, Pennsylvania from 1955 to 1962, was admitted to the Pennsylvania bar in 1965, and was a lawyer in private practice.

U.S. House of Representatives
Defeating incumbent Representative Joseph S. Ammerman, Clinger was elected as a Republican to the 96th and to the eight succeeding Congresses (January 3, 1979 – January 3, 1997). While in the House of Representatives, he was chairman of the United States House Committee on Government Reform and Oversight in the 104th Congress, which was quite active in investigating the Travelgate and Filegate matters. In addition, he served as vice chairman of the United States House Committee on Transportation and Infrastructure and ranking member on the Subcommittee on Aviation. Along with then-Senator William Cohen, Clinger co-authored the Information Technology Management Reform Act, also known as the Clinger-Cohen Act. He was not a candidate for re-election to the 105th Congress in 1996.

Later life
After his retirement from Congress, Clinger served as the chairman for the Chautauqua Institution's board of trustees. He was a senior fellow at Johns Hopkins University's Center for Advanced Governmental Studies  and co-chairman of the board of directors for the Institute for Representative Government. He was also a member of the ReFormers Caucus of Issue One.

In October 2016, Clinger was one of thirty Republican ex-lawmakers to sign a public letter condemning GOP presidential nominee (and future president) Donald Trump as "manifestly unqualified to be president." Clinger died at the age of 92 on May 28, 2021.

References

External links
 
 

|-

|-

|-

1929 births
2021 deaths
Johns Hopkins University alumni
Pennsylvania lawyers
People from Warren, Pennsylvania
Military personnel from Pennsylvania
Republican Party members of the United States House of Representatives from Pennsylvania
The Hill School alumni
United States Navy officers
Whitewater controversy
20th-century American politicians